Susan Johnson (born dec 4 1939), is an American author of numerous New York Times bestselling sexually explicit romance novels. She is unusual among romance writers for providing footnotes in some of her novels.

Bibliography

Stand Alone Titles
Pure Sin (1994)
Temporary Mistress (2000)
Seduction in Mind (2001)
Tempting (2002)
Again and Again (2003)
Pure Silk (2004)

Carre Series
Outlaw (1993)
To Please a Lady (1999)

Darley Series
When You Love Someone (2006)
When Someone Loves You (2006)
At Her Service (2008)

St.John/Duras
Sinful (1993)
Taboo (1996)
Wicked (1997)
A Touch of Sin (1999)
Legendary Lover (2000)

Braddock Black
Blaze (1992)
Forbidden (1991)
Silver Flame (1993)
Brazen (1995)
Force of Nature (2003)

Russian series
Seized by Love (1994)
Love Storm (1995)
Sweet Love Survive (1996)
Golden Paradise (2001)

Bruton Street Bookstore Series
Gorgeous As Sin (2009)
Sexy As Hell (2010)
Sweet as the Devil (2011)
Seductive as Flame (December 2011)

Hot Contemporaries
Blonde Heat (2002)
Hot Legs (2005)
Hot Pink (2003)
Hot Spot (2005)
Hot Streak (2004)
French Kiss (2006)
Wine, Tarts and Sex (2007)
Hot Property (2008)

Anthologies
Rough Around the Edges (1998)
Captivated(1999)
Naughty, Naughty (1999)
Delighted (2002)
Taken by Surprise(2003)
Fascinated (2000)
Strangers in the Night (2004)
Not Just for Tonight (2005)
Twin Peaks (2005)
Perfect Kisses (2007)
Undone (2010)

References

External links
 Susan Johnson website

Living people
1939 births
American romantic fiction writers
American women novelists
21st-century American novelists
20th-century American novelists
Women romantic fiction writers
20th-century American women writers
21st-century American women writers